1672 Gezelle, provisional designation , is a carbonaceous asteroid from the outer region of the asteroid belt, approximately 27 kilometers in diameter. It was discovered on 29 January 1935, by Belgian astronomer Eugène Delporte at Royal Observatory of Belgium in Uccle, Belgium. It was later named after Flemish poet and Roman Catholic priest Guido Gezelle.

Orbit and classification 

The C-type asteroid orbits the Sun at a distance of 2.3–4.0 AU once every 5 years and 8 months (2,063 days). Its orbit has an eccentricity of 0.28 and an inclination of 1° with respect to the ecliptic. Its observation arc begins 9 days after its official discovery observation.

Physical characteristics

Rotation period 

Astronomer James W. Brinsfield obtained a rotational lightcurve of Gezelle at the Via Capote Observatory  in October 2008. It gave a well defined rotation period of 40.72 hours with a brightness variation of 0.56 magnitude. In 2016, similar periods of 40.6821 and 40.6824 hours were obtained from modeled photometric observations derived from the Lowell Photometric Database and other sources.

Diameter and albedo 

According to the surveys carried out by the Japanese Akari satellite and NASA's Wide-field Infrared Survey Explorer with its subsequent NEOWISE mission, Gezelle measures between 26.21 and 26.56 kilometers in diameter and its surface has an albedo between 0.055 and 0.093. The Collaborative Asteroid Lightcurve Link assumes a standard albedo for carbonaceous asteroids of 0.057 and calculates a diameter of 27.90 kilometers based on an absolute magnitude of 11.5.

Naming 

This minor planet was named in memory of famous Flemish poet and Roman Catholic priest Guido Gezelle (1830–1899), who wrote extensively on religion and nature. The official naming citation was published by the Minor Planet Center on 8 April 1982.

References

External links 
 Asteroid Lightcurve Database (LCDB), query form (info )
 Dictionary of Minor Planet Names, Google books
 Asteroids and comets rotation curves, CdR – Observatoire de Genève, Raoul Behrend
 Discovery Circumstances: Numbered Minor Planets (1)-(5000)  – Minor Planet Center
 
 

001672
Discoveries by Eugène Joseph Delporte
Named minor planets
19350129